Miko Coffee is part of the Miko Group. It was established in 1801 by Leo Michielsen but they did not develop a coffee roasting business until 1900.. In 2004, they added Puro as business to business brand.
The name is derived from a combination of the words "Michielsen" and "Koffie".

References 

Coffee companies
Coffee in Europe
Agriculture companies of Belgium
1801 establishments in the Southern Netherlands
Food and drink companies established in 1801